The Minister of International Relations and Cooperation is the foreign minister of the South African government, with political responsibility for South Africa's foreign relations and the Department of International Relations and Cooperation. The present minister is Naledi Pandor, who was appointed by President Cyril Ramaphosa on 29 May 2019.

After the creation of the Union of South Africa as a British dominion in 1910, its foreign relations were initially carried out by the British Foreign Office. However, in 1927 the South African government established a Department of External Affairs. From 1927 until 1955, the Prime Minister also served as foreign minister.

List of foreign ministers of South Africa

References

External links
 Department of International Relations and Cooperation

International Relations and Cooperation
 
Lists of political office-holders in South Africa